Invasion U.S.A.  may refer to:
 Invasion, U.S.A. (1952 film), starring Dan O'Herlihy
 Invasion U.S.A. (1985 film), starring Chuck Norris
 Invasion U.S.A. (album), by the Riverdales